Varistaipale canal is a Finnish canal in Heinävesi. It is another of the canals which connects Juojärvi to Varisvesi. The canal is a part of Heinävesi route (Heinäveden reitti), a route with six canals: Kerma, Vihovuonne, Pilppa, Karvio, Taivallahti and Varistaipale canals. The canal was built in 1911–1913 and has four locks. It is the biggest canal in Finland being the only canal to have this many locks.

Next to the canal there is a canal museum.

See also 
 Saimaa canal, the longest canal in Finland

Sources 
 Varistaipale canal 
 Heinäveden historia II (The History of Heinävesi II), 1989.

External links 
 
 Varistaipale Canal Museum

1913 establishments in Finland
Canals in Finland
Heinävesi
Buildings and structures in South Savo
Museums in South Savo
Canal museums
Transport museums in Finland
Canals opened in 1913